David Reiner Faringer Sr. (September 17, 1883 – May 11, 1969) was an American football player and coach. Faringer played college football at Ursinus College, where he was also served as the head football coach in 1906.  Faringer graduated from the University of Pennsylvania School of Medicine in 1909 and later had a general medical practice in Philadelphia. He died on May 11, 1969.

Head coaching record

References

External links
 

1883 births
1969 deaths
American primary care physicians
20th-century American physicians
Ursinus Bears football coaches
Ursinus Bears football players
Perelman School of Medicine at the University of Pennsylvania alumni
People from Montgomery County, Pennsylvania
Coaches of American football from Pennsylvania
Players of American football from Pennsylvania